John Fraser Tomson (January 31, 1918 — December 14, 2001) was a British-born professional ice hockey player who played 15 games in the National Hockey League with the New York Americans between 1939 and 1941. The rest of his career, which lasted form 1937 to 1951, was spent in various minor leagues. Born in Uxbridge, England, United Kingdom, he was raised in Canada, and died in 2001.

Career statistics

Regular season and playoffs

See also
List of National Hockey League players from the United Kingdom

External links 

Jack Tomson's profile at Hockey Reference.com

1918 births
2001 deaths
English ice hockey players
Kansas City Greyhounds players
New York Americans players
New Westminster Royals (WHL) players
People from Uxbridge
Philadelphia Ramblers players
Seattle Ironmen players
Seattle Olympics players
Seattle Seahawks (ice hockey) players
Springfield Indians players